St Pancras Hospital is part of the Camden and Islington NHS Foundation Trust in St Pancras area of  Central London, near Camden Town. The hospital specialises in geriatric and psychiatric medicine.

History
The hospital was established as the infirmary for the St Pancras Union Workhouse in 1848. The hospital is partly housed in the original 18th century workhouse buildings. After St Pancras North Infirmary opened in Highgate in 1869, the hospital in St Pancras Way became known as the St Pancras South Infirmary. After the North Infirmary was renamed Highgate Hospital the South Infirmary was renamed St Pancras Hospital in 1920. It joined the National Health Service in 1948 under the management of the University College Hospital.

The former maternity wards were occupied by the Hospital for Tropical Diseases from 1951 until 1998. After the hospital chapel became a day nursery, chaplaincy services were provided by St Pancras Old Church. During the 1990s the hospital came under the management of the Camden and Islington NHS Foundation Trust.

In January 1999 an independent report revealed abuse at Beach House, one of the geriatric units of the hospital, where nurses hit and tied up elderly mentally ill patients, and racially intimidated colleagues who threatened to report them.

A paedophile nurse was sacked in February 2005 and subsequently struck off. The number of mental health beds was reduced between 2007 and 2008.

Notable patients
Notable patients have included:
 Writer Robert Heron died in the hospital on 13 April 1807.
 Charles Sydney Gibbes, English tutor to the children of Emperor Nicholas II of Russia, died in the hospital on 24 March 1963.
 Comic novelist Sir Kingsley Amis died in the hospital on 22 October 1995.

See also
 Healthcare in London

References

External links
 NHS Choices: St Pancras Hospital

NHS hospitals in London
Health in the London Borough of Camden
St Pancras, London